Beşiktaş Basketbol, for sponsorship reasons Beşiktaş Emlakjet is a Turkish professional basketball team from the city of İstanbul. The team formed in 1967 as the basketball section of Beşiktaş J.K., which was founded in 1903. The team competes in the Turkish Basketball Super League and in the FIBA Europe Cup.

History
The club's men's basketball section started out in the year 1967 and since then, Beşiktaş has played in the first Turkish Basketball Super League, in every season, except in the 1988–89 season, due to their relegation to the Turkish Basketball First League after the 1987–88 season.

In October 2010, Beşiktaş announced the biggest transfer in the history of the club's basketball department, with the signing of the former NBA Most Valuable Player, Allen Iverson. Iverson signed a 2-year $4 million net income contract.

In July 2011, NBA All-Star Deron Williams of the Brooklyn Nets, announced he would play for Beşiktaş, due to the 2011 NBA lockout. His $5 million net income contract included a clause that would enable him to return to the NBA during the regular season, if an agreement was made between the owners and players association. When the lockout finished, Williams was replaced by Carlos Arroyo.

Arroyo led the team to the Turkish Cup title in February 2012. In April 2012, the team won the 3rd-tier level EuroChallenge Final against Elan Chalon. After the EuroChallenge championship, the team won the Turkish Basketball Super League Finals against Anadolu Efes. On September 30, 2012, the team won the Turkish President's Cup against Anadolu Efes.

Sponsorship naming
Beşiktaş has had several denominations through the years due to its sponsorship;

 Beşiktaş Cola Turka: 2005–2011
 Beşiktaş Milangaz: 2011–2012
 Beşiktaş Integral Forex: 2013–2015
 Beşiktaş Sompo Japan: 2015–2020
 Beşiktaş Icrypex: 2021–2022
 Beşiktaş Emlakjet: 2022–present

Players

Retired numbers

Current roster

Depth chart

Notable players

  Erman Kunter
  Haluk Yıldırım
  Ufuk Sarıca
  Sertaç Şanlı
  Efe Aydan
  Engin Atsür
  Kaya Peker
  Kerem Tunçeri
  Levent Topsakal
  Kenan Sipahi
  Ömer Büyükaycan
  Serhat Çetin
  Semih Erden
  Erkan Veyseloğlu
  Sinan Güler
  Tamer Oyguç
  Barış Hersek
  Kartal Özmızrak
  Alperen Şengün
  Şehmus Hazer
  Egemen Güven
  Ryan Broekhoff
  Ratko Varda
  Damir Markota
  Sandro Nicević
  Erik Murphy
  Robin Benzing
  Pops Mensah-Bonsu
  Kimani Ffriend
  Virginijus Praškevičius
  Gediminas Orelik
  Predrag Drobnjak
  Maciej Lampe
  Michał Sokołowski
  Carlos Arroyo
  Larry Ayuso
  Rick Apodaca
  Fedor Likholitov
  Vladimir Štimac
  Zoran Erceg
  Allen Iverson
  Chris Lofton
  Deron Williams
  Earl Clark
  Jo Jo English
  Khalid El-Amin
  Donnell Harvey
  Lonny Baxter
  Mire Chatman
 - D. J. Strawberry
  Isaiah Whitehead

Head coaches

  Cavit Altunay: 1967–70
  Aydan Siyavuş: 1970–71
  Ünal Büyükaycan: 1971–73
  Cavit Altunay: 1973–74
  Ateş Çubukçu /  Tom Davis: 1974–75
  Ateş Çubukçu /  Tom Davis /  Tanju Feyzioğlu: 1975
  Mehmet Baturalp: 1975–79
  Fehmi Sadıkoğlu: 1979–85
  Hurşit Baytok: 1985–86
  Aydan Siyavuş: 1986–87
  Hurşit Baytok: 1987–89
  İren İmre: 1989–90
  Mehmet Baturalp: 1990–91
  İren İmre: 1991–93
  Hakan Yavuz: 1993–94
  Cem Akdağ: 1994–95
  Tolga Tuğsavul: 1995–96
  Erman Kunter: 1996–97
  Ahmet Kandemir: 1997–03
  İhsan Bayülken: 2003–05
  Burak Bıyıktay: 2005
  Murat Didin: 2005–07
  Ufuk Sarıca: 2007
  Ergin Ataman: 2007–08
  Hakan Demir: 2008–09
  Burak Bıyıktay: 2009–11
  Ergin Ataman: 2011–12
  Erman Kunter: 2012–13
  Ahmet Kandemir: 2013–15
  Henrik Dettmann: 2015–16
  Yağızer Uluğ: 2016
  Ufuk Sarıca: 2016–18
  Duško Ivanović: 2018–20
  Burak Bıyıktay: 2020
  Ahmet Kandemir: 2020–2022
  Igor Miličić: 2022–present

Honours

National competitions
Turkish Basketball Super League : 
 Winner (2): 1975, 2012
 Runners-up (7): 1972, 1976, 1977, 1982, 1983, 2005, 2017
Turkish Cup:
 Winner (1): 2012
 Runners-up (3): 1971, 1973, 2011
Turkish President's Cup
 Winner (1): 2012
 Runner-up (1): 1987

European competitions
EuroCup:
Quarter-final (1): 2008
EuroChallenge:
 Winner (1): 2012
Korać Cup:
Quarter-final (1): 1999
FIBA Europe League:
Quarter-final (1): 2013

Season by season

 Cancelled due to the COVID-19 pandemic in Europe.

See also
Beşiktaş J.K.

References

External links
 
Eurobasket.com Profile
TBLStat.net Profile

Basketball teams established in 1933
Basketball teams in Turkey
Beşiktaş Basketball
Sport in Beşiktaş
Turkish Basketball Super League teams
1933 establishments in Turkey
Sports teams in Istanbul